Ewa Mizdal (born 18 July 1987 in Lublin) is a Polish weightlifter.

She represented Poland at the 2012 Summer Olympics, in the event Weightlifting Women's 75 kg. She was ranked 7th with a total of 231 kg. She advanced to 4th place after disqualification of some other competitors due to doping violations.

References

1987 births
Living people
Polish female weightlifters
Olympic weightlifters of Poland
Weightlifters at the 2012 Summer Olympics
Sportspeople from Lublin
20th-century Polish women
21st-century Polish women